The 1968 United States presidential election in Delaware was held on November 5, 1968. State voters chose three representatives, or electors to the Electoral College, who voted for president and vice president.

Delaware was won by the Republican former Vice President Richard Nixon, who won the state by 7,529 votes over Democratic incumbent Vice President Hubert Humphrey. Also running was Alabama Governor George Wallace on the "American Independent" ticket.

County Results

See also
 United States presidential elections in Delaware

Notes

References

Delaware
1968 Delaware elections
1968